Kağan Miray Bağış (born 10 April 1998) is a Turkish professional footballer who plays as a winger for Yeni Mersin İdmanyurdu on loan from the Süper Lig club İstanbulspor.

Career
Bağış began his senior career with Manisaspor in 2016. He joined Bodrumspor on loan on 1 February 2017. He transferred to İstanbulspor on 8 May 2019, signing a 5-year contract. He helped İstanbulspor achieve promotion in the 2021–22 season for the first time in 17 years. He made his professional debut in İstanbulspor's return to the Süper Lig in a 2–0 season opening loss to Trabzonspor on 5 August 2022.

References

External links
 
 

1998 births
Living people
People from Kayseri
Turkish footballers
Manisaspor footballers
Giresunspor footballers
İstanbulspor footballers
Süper Lig players
TFF First League players
TFF Third League players
Association football wingers